Mummies Alive! is an animated series from DIC Productions L.P. and Northern Lights Entertainment. It originally aired for one season in 1997. The show was part of a general trend of "mummymania" in 1990s pop culture.

Plot
In ancient Egypt, an evil sorcerer named Scarab kills the pharaoh's son, Prince Rapses, to become immortal. Entombed alive for his crime (Rapses' body was also never found), Scarab revives in the modern world and begins his search for Rapses' reincarnation, a San Francisco-dwelling boy named Presley Carnovan, to retrieve the spirit of Rapses so he can become immortal. Rapses' (Presley's) bodyguards, Ja-Kal, Rath, Armon, and Nefer-Tina, along with Rapses' cat, Kahti, awake from the dead to protect him from Scarab. They use the power of Ra to transform into powerful guardians.

Each of the mummies is aligned with the power of an Egyptian god. Ja-Kal uses the spirit of a falcon, Rath uses the spirit of a snake, Armon uses the spirit of a ram, and Nefer-Tina uses the spirit of a cat. The mummies are able to call upon it for magical armor and powers to fight superhuman evildoers  by shouting "With the strength of Ra!". Once their strength is exhausted, they must rest in their sarcophagi to regain the ability. The mummies also have the power to make a horrifying face, usually used to scare away nosy bystanders.

In addition to Scarab, the mummies often had to contend with gods and spirits from Egyptian myth summoned to the modern world, including Anubis, Set, Geb, Apep, Bast, Sekhmet, Bes, and many others, usually as part of one of Scarab's schemes that went out of his control.

Characters

Main

Humans
 Presley Carnovan – voiced by Bill Switzer: A 12-year-old boy who has the spirit of prince Rapses XII (an ancient pharaoh) who is based on Ramses (prince Rapses reincarnated as Presley Carnovan). He soon discovers this when the Mummies introduce themselves as his guardians. He lives in San Francisco with his mother. He is reluctant to accept his role as Rapses, but on at least two occasions where he had the chance to be freed of his role, when Rapses's father (apparently) came through the Western Gate and when the original Rapses was drawn into the present, he expressed reluctance at losing his status as "pharaoh" because it would have also meant him losing the mummies.
 Prince Rapses: He was the heir to the Egyptian throne 3500 years ago. He was protected by the Mummies (before they were Mummies) but was killed when he was Presley's age by Scarab. This story is told in Sleep Walk Like an Egyptian. His spirit now lies within Presley, and is drawn out by Scarab in several episodes. Rapses himself comes to the present in The Prince and the Presley, when Scarab steals a time travel scroll to draw him to the present in the hopes that he would be easier to capture than the present Presley. Rapses returns to the past at the end of the episode.
 Amanda Carnovan – voiced by Louise Vallance: Presley's mother. She works at the City Museum. In Ghouls' Gold, Armon refers to her as "the wise Amanda" when recalling advice she gave Presley. She has insecure feelings that Presley misses being with his father, who is away on business, and tries to bond with her son often, such as taking him out camping, trying to fulfil the role of a father and a mother.

Mummies
 Ja-Kal – voiced by Dale Wilson: The leader of the Mummies, in his transformed state, his armor resembles a falcon and it also allows him to fly. His weapon are his razor sharp talons/claws and a bow that can shoot out flaming arrows. In ancient Egypt, Ja-Kal was a hunter who had a wife named Tia and a newborn son named Padjet; he died without knowing what happened to his family. He worries the most of Presley's safety, often acting as a father-figure to him. He commonly uses hunting terms to talk to others and explain situations. Ja-Kal commonly cares for other people's needs first and himself second. In "Family Feud: Part 2 – New Mummy in Town", it was revealed that he had a brother, named Arakh, who was a notorious bandit.
 Rath – voiced by Scott McNeil: The most intelligent of the Mummies (but also the most arrogant) and also the only one able to cast spells. When he transforms, a green snake which turns into a golden cobra wraps around him and serves as his armor. His weapon of choice is a sword that can transform into a snake, but he is also able to perform magical incantations. He also designed and built the Mummies' vehicles. In the past, he served as the young Prince's tutor. He claims to know about science, but his definition is such things as turning a staff into a serpent, although he has learned to adapt some spells to the present (such as a spell that summoned underground snakes to bind his enemies in the past, but now summons electric cables in the present) though they are enemies, Scarab does respect him for his spellcasting skills.
 Armon – voiced by Graeme Kingston: Armon is huge and eats very often. He is very strong even when he has not transformed. He is missing his right arm and when he transforms he obtains a golden arm that is used as his weapon. His armor resembles a ram. In Ghouls' Gold, it was explained that Armon lost his real arm fighting in the Pharaoh's army, the pharaoh then gave him his golden arm. While not fighting, Armon spends most of his time eating or watching "the magic box" TV that Presley gave them. In the past, Armon was Rapses' teacher of combat.
 Nefer-Tina – voiced by Cree Summer: She is the only female of the Mummies. She is an expert with her whip, has great agility and is extremely proficient at driving the Hot-Ra - the Mummies' dragster-like vehicle. When she transforms her armor is like a cat. Back in ancient Egypt, she had to hide the fact that she was a girl with a head piece or she would not have been allowed to drive chariots. She was known to everyone as Nefer. Only prince Rapses knew her true identity during that period of time. Ja-Kal and the other members were shocked to find out the truth about Nefer-Tina. Armon then comments "No wonder he never went swimming in the Nile with us". Out of the group, she is the only one who is absolutely willing to try anything modern such as driving a car and constantly learns under Presley. She also travels the modern world in disguise to try new things. Nefer-Tina's name was based on queen Nefertiti.
 Scarab – voiced by Gerard Plunkett: The Pharaoh's adviser, who later sucked the life force from prince Rapses for youth and immortality, however, the effects were not permanent and started to wear off after a few centuries, now with prince Rapses reincarnated as Presley Carnovan, he will stop at nothing to steal the prince's life force again, when Scarab transforms, his body is covered in golden and purple armor, resembling that of a scarab beetle and possessing the power of flight, he also possesses a magical talking snake named Heka that acts as his magical staff from time to time, much to her dismay, his powers include shooting energy blasts from his hands, the creation of Shabti, and extensive knowledge in summoning creatures from the afterlife in ancient Egypt. However, he has also seen to have a good grasp of modern technology, as seen most keenly in Sleight of Hand, where he used technology while competing against the mummies in a mystical contest to try to become Presley's "guardian" himself (although Ja-Kal and Presley were able to expose the deception at the last minute).
 Harris Stone: The identity Scarab takes when he needs to be in public. Harris Stone is known as a wealthy individual. As a major benefactor for the Museum, he gives a speech in Who's Who that is one to remember. Even though he is trying to kill Rapses, Scarab feels responsible for the Egyptian artifacts of the museum and feels a degree of sadness when they are damaged. He is also quick to offer money to people who oppose his point of view. Scarab killed the real Harris Stone when he discovered his crypt and inadvertently freed him, and took over his identity.
 Heka – voiced by Pauline Newstone: The Snake Familiar and sometimes Staff of Scarab. She acts as his loyal companion and advisor, who often makes snide, sarcastic remarks and witty observations. She also has the ability to spit fire.

Others

Ancient Egyptians
 Amenhotep: Prince Rapses' father, the Pharaoh and ruler of all of Egypt. He was a good Pharaoh and was very respected by all his people. He appears in Scarab and Presley's dreams in Pack to the Future. In Reunion, Scarab makes the Mummies believe that Amenhotep has returned. In Family Feud I – Brother's Keeper, Amenhotep appears in some of Ja-Kal's recollections.
 Ammut (Devourer of Souls): Scarab's dog-like pet. He has the head of a crocodile, the body of a lion and the hindquarters of a hippopotamus. Presley describes him in Pack to the Future as "That's the ugliest dog I've ever seen". Ammut was not summoned by Scarab but simply tagged along with the Pack, and then stuck around - he usually messes up anything Scarab tells him to do. Ammut has good parts in Pack to the Future and Who's Who. In Egyptian Mythology, Ammut is female.
 Apep – voiced by Jason Gray-Stanford: Serpent of the Desert. An anthropomorphic cobra-like creature with an ability to change shape into a young human man. Rapses' grandfather drove Apep out of Egypt and into the desert 3500 years ago. Apep is after revenge and wants Rapses to pay for what his grandfather did to him and when Scarab summons him and his gang, they take on the shapes of a motorbiker gang. However, upon meeting and fighting Nefer-Tina, he falls in love with her and decides to disobey Scarab. Apep appears in Desert Chic and Pepped With Good Intention.
 Arakh: Arakh is Ja-Kal's evil brother and was known as the "Scorpion of the Desert". He can transform into his Scorpion armor. His story is told in the three "Family Feud" episodes.
 Bastet: Cat Goddess of ancient Egypt and the patron goddess of Nefer-Tina, brought to the present in Paws. She demands to be worshiped by the people.
 Bes: Master of Chance and Trickery. He is a small mischievous green dwarf who enjoys playing games on people. He especially enjoys flipping a coin to decide on outcomes quite similar to Batman's Two-Face. Bes appears in Who's Who and Tree O'Clock Rock.
 Enchantra: Rath's student of magic 3500 years ago. She was the best student he ever had, and she became more powerful than Rath. Rath was falling in love with her, but had to stop teaching Chontra when the pharaoh ordered him to teach Prince Rapses. For that, Chontra became vengeful and wants to make Rath pay. She gets her first chance in Good Bye Mr. Cheops. She tries again in Tempting Offer and Eye of the Beholder.
 The Eye of Darkness: Horrific monster trapped in a mirror. No one knows his origin. Every 3500 years, when the planets align, he seeks the soul of a Pharaoh so he can exchange himself with the spirit to free himself from the mirror. The Pharaoh's soul would then be lost until the planets realign in 3500 more years (a fact that allowed the Mummies to deduce that Scarab was not involved in its release as Scarab would want Presley's soul for himself). Once unleashed, no power on earth would be able to stop him. Only the one who sets the spell in motion can stop him. The Eye of Darkness makes its appearance in The Face in the Mirror.
 Geb: Spirit of the Earth – a huge rock giant that makes earthquakes when he walks. He is a rather unintelligent giant that attacks anyone who disturbs him. Geb is first featured in The Gift of Geb. Geb also has a major part in Monster Truck Mania. It is revealed that he is married to Net, goddess of the sky, in Married to the Geb.
 Ka: A headless and bodiless guy with just two arms who is a spirit that lives inside Scarab and comes out of his mouth. In ancient Egyptian religion, the Ka is the spirit of a man's soul and is represented by the symbol of two upright arms.
 Kahti: The sacred cat, sometimes called the sacred kitty. Kahti can transform into a bigger, more-powerful, lynx-sized cat. She was Prince Rapses' pet 3500 years ago, and occasionally serves as Presley's more "immediate" guardian by staying near him when he is not with the other Mummies, her small size allowing her to escape being noticed.
 Kenna: Friend of Nefer-Tina 3500 years ago. Enchantra appears as Kenna in Eye of the Beholder.
 Kimas: Arakh's son and Ja-Kal's nephew. He might not truly be considered a bad guy, but does side with Scarab and cause the Mummies a lot of grief before he determines where his true allegiances lie. He also can transform into Scorpion armor like his father. Kimas appears in the second and third "Family Feud" episodes.
 Net (Spirit of the Sky): A cloudlike being who can produce rain and lightning and can turn into a tornado. Geb and Net might be called your typical married couple. They have a little spat in Married to the Geb. In mythology, Net is spelled as "Nut", but she and Geb are spouses and siblings of each other.
 Nuhn (Spirit of the Primeval Waters): A powerful water-spirit occasionally summoned by Scarab for various schemes. He is self-important, irreverent, and has a morbid, yet slapstick sense of humor. Nuhn appears in High Nuhn and Water, Water, Everywhere.
 Sekhmet: Ancient goddess of sickness and health. She has destroyed whole civilizations with her evil temper. Unlike in actual Egyptian depiction where she is a lion-headed goddess, she has the head of a vulture in this version. Nobody was ever able to defeat her. Sekhmet appears in The Curse of the Sekhmet when Scarab summons her to cure his cold - enraged at being summoned for such a trifle, she sets out to destroy the city and Scarab and Rath have to team up to banish her.
 Set and Anubis – voiced by Scott McNeil (Set) and Blu Mankuma (Anubis): Set is a bulldog-headed spirit who is leader of the "Trackers of Souls". He calls himself "Dog of the Desert, Master of Evil, Lord of Thunder". Anubis, the not-so-competent jackal (wild dog) spirit of the underworld, tags along with Set. Anubis has a scepter that causes "the sleep of forgetting". They appear in Pack to the Future, The Face In The Mirror, Dog Bites Mummy, and Family Feud I – Brother's Keeper. They are often summoned by Scarab, but occasionally did turn on him when they did not like to be ordered around. Unlike in real Egyptian mythology, where Anubis is a mostly neutral and clever god, he is one of the villains and is rather dim-witted, often being outsmarted by Presley. In Egyptian Mythology, Set doesn't have the head of a dog.
 Shabti: Golem-like armies of men made of clay controlled by Scarab. They are very easy to defeat as they break into pieced when toppled, but usually there are quite many of them. They also shatter easily when hit and dissolve in water. They most often look like Egyptians, but can be dressed up as anything, such as construction workers or policemen. Sometimes, if they are broken in half, both halves can still function independently.
 Talos (Man of Bronze): Brought to life by Scarab. In natural form he is 100 feet tall, but can reduce his size. In Body Slam, he reduces himself to about 10 feet tall and 500 pounds for the Tournament. Then in Miscast, he is recreated by Rath. He comes back looking for a mate in Object of His Affections. Talos is from Greek mythology. The human anklebone is called the "Talus".
 Tia: Ja-Kal's wife 3500 years ago. They had a small baby son named Padjet. In Sleep Walk Like an Egyptian, the scene shows the last time Ja-Kal sees Tia and Padjet. Tia gives Ja-Kal an imprint of his son's hand. This hand print is now a sad memory for Ja-Kal of the family he once had. At the end of Sleep Walk Like an Egyptian, Presley asks Ja-Kal, "What happened to your family?" Ja-Kal responds sadly with, "I don't know". Presley then says, "It was Rapses fault – my fault! I don't know how, but some day I'll make it up to you. I promise!" Ja-Kal thinks about Tia and Padjet in Eye of the Beholder and Chontra appears as Tia.

Modern humans
 Agent Phillips: Works as a Regional Subdirector for the Department of Federal Investigation. He analyzes Rath in We've Got One.
 Bix Bingsley: A clumsy, nerdy sales clerk who sells clothes but is allergic to wool. Nonetheless, he gets a kiss from Nefer-Tina in True Believer.
 Bob: Rotund police officer, and Joe Pendleton's partner.
 Cynthia Lu: Walter's older sister. Presley has a crush on her, but she is a couple of years older than Presley and likes Benjamin who is in college. Cynthia usually cannot even remember Presley's name and calls him "Preston" or "Wesley".
 Charlie the Janitor: The janitor at the City Museum. Murdoch is his dog. Charlie is an old navy man. He is really proud of the times when he met Mike Conners (Mannix) in '62. Charlie appears in Honey, I Shrunk the Mummies.
 Elaine Setter: She is a student in Presley's grade. She likes Presley, but often has a tough time getting his attention.
 Joe Pendleton: Joe is a police officer, and the Regional Treasurer of the Third Annual Paranormal Alien Visitors Psychic Convention and Brat-Bust. He finally meets his first "space alien" in A Dark and Shrieky Night when Ja-Kal humors him by making it sound like he is from outer space. Joe and Bob both get deeply involved with the "aliens" in We've Got One. They also appear briefly in many other episodes. Joe is featured in the final episode Show Me the Mummy!.
 Milton Huxley: Presley's science teacher. Known as Mr. Huxley to his students, and considered to be a "science geek", he is someone who never has fun. He also believes there is an explanation for everything. He has starring roles in Good Bye Mr. Cheops and Dr. Jekyll and Mr. Huxley. He also appears in Sleep Walk Like an Egyptian, The Gift of Geb, The Curse of the Sekhmet, Missing Ja-Kal and Eye of the Beholder.
 Mr. Hepplewhite: Amanda Carnovan's boss and the director of the Museum. He makes appearances in Ra, Ra, Ra, Ra, Sleep Walk Like an Egyptian, and Pack to the Future.
 Mr. Ludie: Owns the Java Spot cafe. Presley's mother spends some time with him in Tempting Offer.
 Paul Carnovan: Presley's father who lives in Memphis (presumably Presley's parents are divorced). His dad claims to be an archeologist, but his true activities are somewhat suspect. He visits Presley in My Dad the Hero.
 Professor Henry Bogglesworth: An expert but extremely bad and boring lecturer who discovered the scroll that can open the gates of time. His lecture takes place at the beginning of The Prince and the Presley.
 The General: Head of Federal Investigation and is Agent Phillips' boss.
 Theo, Rosey, Wilcox, and Max: Four homeless street people who befriend Rath when he loses his memory in Dead Man Walking.
 Tiny Turner: The school bully. He and his punk friend Chuck like to rough up the other kids. Tiny and Chuck appear in The Egyp-Tsu Kid and briefly in Dog Bites Mummy and Kid Scarab.
 Walter Lu: Cynthia's brother and Presley's friend who is in 7th grade with him.

Production
Originally, Mummies Alive! was geared towards an older audience, but during production, it became predominantly a children's show. The series ran for one season of 42 episodes; the last two episodes link together to end the show, as it appears episodes 38–40 were the finale of the first season. A second season was planned, but due to low ratings, it was canceled.

Eric and Julia Lewald, writers/producers for Mummies Alive!, were also head writers for the third season of the Gargoyles animated series. The programs share common plot elements, including a group of warriors from the past that awaken in the present to fight a wealthy, immortality-obsessed enemy; their initial difficulties in adapting to the modern world; the use of mythological figures in numerous episodes; and a recurring femme fatale antagonist. These similarities made Mummies Alive! vulnerable to criticism describing it as little more than a Gargoyles clone.

Episodes

Broadcast

North America
Mummies Alive! originally aired on syndicated television stations in the United States (mostly on The WB, UPN and Fox affiliates), being distributed through Hasbro's Claster Television. The following year, the series aired on the Bohbot Kids Network block until 2000.

In September 2004, the series alongside Sonic Underground was added to the syndicated DIC Kids Network block, where both shows would air during the weekends as part of an hour of non-E/I material.

The series previously aired every Sunday on Cookie Jar Toons on This TV.

In Canada, the series aired on YTV.

Overseas
In the United Kingdom, the series first aired on GMTV on the Disney-produced block Diggit as one of its launch programmes. It later aired on Sky One from 1999 until 2002. From 2004-2006, the series aired on ITV2 as part of GMTV2 Kids (later Action Stations!).

In India, the show was dubbed into Tamil and Malayalam and aired on Sun TV and Amrita TV in the early 2000s, becoming popular in South India. In India, the show was telecasted on DD Metro Channel from 1998 - 2000, and was later converted to DD News.

Home video releases

United States
The three part "Family Feud" arc was edited together as a single movie, entitled Mummies Alive! The Legend Begins, and was released on VHS on April 7, 1998, by Buena Vista Home Entertainment.

In August 2001, the first four episodes of the series were released on VHS and DVD simply titled Mummies Alive!, by Lions Gate Home Entertainment and Trimark Home Video. The DVD version also included a bonus episode, as well as an interview with Andy Heyward and Ivan Reitman about the series.

In October 2003, Sterling Entertainment released the first three episodes on VHS and DVD under the title of Mummies Alive! - The Beginning. The DVD release contains the four episode as a bonus. NCircle Entertainment re-released the DVD in August 2007.

Europe
In June 2004, Anchor Bay UK released a single VHS/DVD volume in the United Kingdom containing the first four episodes. The company released a second DVD in August, containing the next four episodes. In June 2005, Avenue Entertainment released two DVDs containing two episodes each.

Three volumes of double DVDs were released in Germany, with 14 episodes on each volume. The complete 42 episode series is available as of March 2017, the release date of the third and final volume. The DVDs are region 2 with German, and English audio as well.

Reception
Harlene Ellin of the Chicago Tribune panned The Legend Begins: "The saga jumps between past and present without warning, giving the story a disjointed feel. And while the animated adventure goes for laughs at times, the jokes generally fall flat". She was also critical of the series' animation: "All the characters move as if they have rigor mortis. Mouths flap open and shut when delivering dialogue, giving the film a primitive look". She gave the movie one star.

Merchandise
To coincide with the animated series, DIC signed deals with various companies to make merchandise for the series.

Hasbro produced a series of Mummies Alive! 5" tall action figures and vehicles in 1997. There were regular and "fright face" varieties of the main mummies. Nefer-Tina and Presley got toys as well, but they are later releases and harder to find. A final wave of toys would have contained a Night Hunter Ja-Kal and Armon, as well as Cobra Strike Pep but only a few of these figures were released in some parts of Europe.

References

External links
 
 
 Mummies Alive! Homepage at lkessler.com

1997 American television series debuts
1997 American television series endings
1990s American animated television series
1990s American daily animated television series
1997 Canadian television series debuts
1997 Canadian television series endings
1990s Canadian animated television series
American children's animated action television series
American children's animated adventure television series
American children's animated fantasy television series
American children's animated horror television series
American children's animated mystery television series
Canadian children's animated action television series
Canadian children's animated adventure television series
Canadian children's animated fantasy television series
Canadian children's animated horror television series
Canadian children's animated mystery television series
Ancient Egypt in fiction
Television series about mummies
English-language television shows
CBS original programming
Human-mummy romance in fiction
Television series by DIC Entertainment
First-run syndicated television programs in the United States
Television shows based on Hasbro toys
Television shows set in San Francisco
Television series based on Egyptian mythology
Television series by Claster Television
Fiction about immortality